J.B & J.D. Van Deusen was a 19th-century American shipbuilding company started by Joseph B. Van Deusen and James D. Van Deusen in 1865. The shipyard was in Williamsburg, Brooklyn. Some of the finest yachts, schooners and steamboats in the New York were designed and built by them. The last boat that was built at the shipyard was the schooner-yacht Mohawk in 1875, which was later renamed Eagre and transferred to the United States Navy in 1903.

History

Joseph B. Van Deusen and his brother James D. Van Deusen started the J.B & J.D. Van Deusen shipyard in 1865, at first located at the foot of 16th Street, New York, then later at Sixth Street in Williamsburg, Brooklyn near the East River. They built many notable yachts, schooners and steamboats.

The Etna Iron Works produced at least a dozen engines for the Van Deusen Brothers.

Joseph continued with the shipbuilding business, when his brother died in 1866, under the name Joseph B. Van Deusen.

Joseph Benoni Van Deusen

Joseph Benoni Van Deusen (June 30, 1832November 4, 1875), was a 19th-century New York shipbuilder. He was the son of Johannes Coude Van Deusen (1792–1838) and Electa Marks (1786–1884). He was a native of Mohawk Valley, born at Palatine Bridge, New York, on June 30, 1832. He married Mary Eleanor Dodd on January 30, 1870, in New York and had one child.

At an early age, Van Deusen was interested in the construction of ships. He enjoyed building ships which he sailed on the Mohawk River, near his home. At the age of 16 years he built the wooden covered bridge, which spanned the Mohawk River between Palatine Bridge and Canajoharie, New York.

Van Deusen came to New York City for the purpose of studying ship building at William H. Webb's Shipbuilding Academy and also with George Steers. When his studies were completed he went into the business with his brother, James DeWitt Van Deusen under the firm name of J D & J B Van Deusen, where they built many notable boats.

Van Deusen was friends with publisher and Yachtsman James Gordon Bennett Jr., and banker and yachtsman Elias Cornelius Benedict. He built the first steamships used by the Fall River Line on the sound and about 30 gunboats for Spain. He was the recipient of a medal from Napoleon III for his models.

In December 1866, J. B. Van Deusen of the New York Yacht Club was a judge on the Fleeting in a race between three American yachts, the Vesta (owned by Pierre Lorillard IV), the Fleetwing (owned by George and Franklin Osgood) and the Henrietta owned by Bennett. Each yachtsman put up $30,000 in the winner-take-all wager. They started off of Sandy Hook, New Jersey, on December 11, 1866, during high westerly winds and raced to The Needles, the furthest westerly point on the Isle of Wight. Bennett's Henrietta won with a time of 13 days, 21 hours, 55 minutes.

Joseph B. Van Deusen died, at age 43, in Brooklyn, New York, on November 4, 1875. He was buried at the Palatine Bridge Cemetery, in Palatine Bridge, Montgomery County, New York.

James DeWitt Van Deusen 

James DeWitt Van Deusen (January 29, 1822March 8, 1866), was a 19th-century New York shipbuilder. He was born on January 29, 1822, in Palatine Bridge, Montgomery County, New York. He was the son of Johannes Gloude Van Deusen and Electa Marks. He married Angelca Ehle on February 22, 1844, in New York City and had two children.

James D. Van Deusen died on March 8, 1866. He was buried at the Palatine Bridge Cemetery, in Palatine Bridge, Montgomery County, New York.

List of ships

Below is a list of ships built by the J.B & J.D. Van Deusen shipyard.

See also
 List of Northeastern U. S. Pilot Boats

References

Companies established in 1865
Defunct shipbuilding companies of the United States
1865 establishments in New York (state)
American shipbuilders